Afrotheora thermodes is a species of moth of the family Hepialidae. It is known from South Africa.

References

External links
Hepialidae genera

Moths described in 1921
Hepialidae
Moths of Africa
Insects of Tanzania